Club Deportivo Valle del Chota is an Ecuadorian professional football club based in Ibarra. It is the current winner of the Segunda Categoría, for which it has gained promotion to the second-level Serie B for the 2011 season.

Current squad

Football clubs in Ecuador
Association football clubs established in 2001
2001 establishments in Ecuador